Ford Bridge railway station was a station in Marlbrook, Herefordshire, England. The station was opened in 1854 and closed in 1954. After closure the station building was converted to a private house

References

Further reading

Disused railway stations in Herefordshire
Railway stations in Great Britain opened in 1854
Railway stations in Great Britain closed in 1954
Former Shrewsbury and Hereford Railway stations